John William Woolsey (26 July 1767 – 9 May 1853) was a Canadian businessman born at Quebec.

Woolsey was the first president of Quebec Bank which was founded in 1818 and incorporated in 1822.

References 
 Biography at the Dictionary of Canadian Biography Online

External links 
John William Woolsey and Family fonds at the National Gallery of Canada, Ottawa, Ontario

1767 births
1853 deaths
Royal Bank of Canada presidents